Froeschneria piligera is a species of dirt-colored seed bug in the family Rhyparochromidae.

References

Rhyparochromidae
Articles created by Qbugbot
Insects described in 1862